Odd-Even Bustnes (born 17 November, 1969) is a Norwegian Rower. He competed in the men's coxless four event at the 1996 Summer Olympics.

References

External links
 

1969 births
Living people
Norwegian male rowers
Olympic rowers of Norway
Rowers at the 1996 Summer Olympics
Sportspeople from Hamar